The 2012 Minnesota Stars FC season was the club's third year of existence and their first season under the simple moniker Minnesota Stars after being called NSC Minnesota Stars for their first two seasons of existence. The team played in the North American Soccer League, the second tier of the American soccer pyramid, for the second consecutive year.

Outside of NASL play, the Stars competed in the 2012 U.S. Open Cup, reaching the fourth round before losing to the San Jose Earthquakes of Major League Soccer.

Background
The Minnesota Stars FC Started the 2012 Regular season as the defending NASL Champions. The home opener was scheduled at the Hubert H. Humphrey Metrodome vs the defending NASL regular season champions, the Carolina RailHawks.

The Stars were still leagued owned at the start of the season; this could have meant that the 2012 season could have been the last season for the franchise.

On November 8, 2012, NASL announced that Dr. William McGuire would be the new owner of the Stars, saving the Stars from possible contraction.

Roster

Staff

Transfers

Winter

In:

Out:

Summer

In:

Out:

Friendlies

Competitions

NASL

Standings

Results

NASL Playoffs

Soccer Bowl

U.S. Open Cup

Squad statistics

Appearances and goals

|-
|colspan="14"|Players who left NSC Minnesota Stars during the season:
|}

Goal scorers

Disciplinary record

References

Minnesota United FC seasons
Minnesota Stars Football Club
Minnesota Stars Football Club
Minnesota Stars